Indonesian Japanese or Japanese Indonesian may refer to

 Indonesia–Japan relations
 Japanese occupation of Indonesia
 Indonesians in Japan
 Japanese people in Indonesia
 Multiracial people of mixed Indonesian and Japanese descent